Lisa Congdon (born January 17, 1968) is an American fine artist, author and illustrator.

She has worked for clients including MoMA, Harvard University, Martha Stewart Living, REI, and Chronicle Books. Congdon is the author of Art Inc: The Essential Guide to Building Your Career as an Artist; Whatever You Are, Be a Good One; Twenty Ways to Draw a Tulip; Fortune Favors the Brave; The Joy of Swimming; A Glorious Freedom: Older Women Leading Extraordinary Lives; and A Collection A Day. She has also illustrated six coloring books for adults as part of her Just Add Color series. Notable books adorned by Lisa’s illustrations include Broad Strokes (Chronicle Books, 2017) and Tender Buttons by Gertrude Stein (Chronicle Books, 2013).

Biography
Congdon grew up in upstate New York and Northern California. She married her partner Clay Lauren Walsh on June 1, 2013. She lives and works in Portland, Oregon.

Awards and honors
Congdon was named one of 40 Women Over 40 to Watch in 2015. and she is featured in the 2017 book, 200 Women Who Will Change the Way you See the World.

Authored books

A Collection A Day
Congdon started a blog called A Collection A Day, which was started in January 2010. Over the course of a year, Congdon posted a collection a day of various items she has acquired. According to Congdon, the collections were assembled from "flea markets, thrift stores, junk shops, garage sales, giveaway piles and family attics." The collections featured are often everyday objects such as 14 mid-century napkin rings (day 113) or eight old pencil sharpeners for Day 78).

A Collection A Day was published as a printed book in 2011 by UPPERCASE magazine.

Whatever You Are, Be a Good One
Published in April 2014 by Chronicle Books, Whatever You Are, Be a Good One is a collection of 100 timeless quotes from some of histories' most notable minds, all illustrated and hand-lettered by Lisa Congdon. Some of the quotes come from the likes of Albert Camus, Oscar Wilde, Leo Tolstoy, and Anais Nin.

The book began when Congdon wanted to incorporate more hand-lettering into her practice, which she started to do by creating her "365 Days of Hand Lettering Project" on her blog over the course of 2012. The project evolved from drawing individual letters to full quotes. Over time, after Congdon had shared these images, she learned that readers found that the quotes had "...comforted them in times of darkness or reminded them to approach a challenge in a new way." From there, the focus of the book became a celebration of great thinkers as well as a way of sharing their words with a larger community.

Art Inc. The Essential Guide for Building Your Career as an Artist
Congdon also authored Art Inc. The Essential Guide for Building Your Career as an Artist which was published in August 2014 by Chronicle Books. The book introduces information about creating and starting a creative business, as well as offers insight from other illustrators, designers and entrepreneurs. The book offers tools and information on how to "set actionable goals, diversify your income, manage your bookkeeping, copyright your work, promote with social media, build a standout website, exhibit with galleries, sell and price your work, license your art, acquire an agent, and more."

Fortune Favors the Brave
Published in August 2015 by Chronicle Books, and similar to here prior book Whatever You Are, Be A Good One, Fortune Favors the Brave features 100 illustrated and hand-lettered quotations themed on courage, bravery, authenticity, and being yourself.

The Joy of Swimming:  A Celebration of Our Love for Getting in the Water
Debuted in April 2016 and published by Chronicle Books, The Joy of Swimming:  A Celebration of Our Love for Getting in the Water, celebrates swimming through inspirational hand lettered quotes, watercolor portraits of swimmers paired with real personal swimming stories, and illustrated collections of swimming objects such and traditional pool signs, bathing suits through history. The book also includes a foreword written by Lynne Cox, an American long-distance open-water swimmer and writer.

A Glorious Freedom: Older Women Leading Extraordinary Lives 
Published by Chronicle Books in October 2017, A Glorious Freedom: Older Women Leading Extraordinary Lives, explores the power of women over the age of forty who are thriving and living life on their own terms. Profiles, interviews, and essays from women—including Vera Wang, Laura Ingalls Wilder, Julia Child, Cheryl Strayed, and many more—who've found creative fulfillment and accomplished great things in the second half of their lives are lavishly illustrated and hand-lettered in Congdon's signature style.

Art exhibitions 
Congdon's gallery (group and solo) shows include participation at the Dorothy Saxe Invitational Exhibition at the Contemporary Jewish Museum (San Francisco, 2012), Museum of Design (Atlanta, 2017), Bedford Gallery (Walnut Creek, CA, 2013, 2014), and Fullerton College in 2018.

She has participated in artist residencies at Summit Powder Mountain (2015) and Fullerton College (2018).

References

External links
Official website

1968 births
Living people
Artists from Portland, Oregon
American illustrators
American women artists
21st-century American non-fiction writers
American women bloggers
American bloggers
21st-century American women writers
American women non-fiction writers